Albert Stohr (13 November 1890 – 3 June 1961) was Bishop of Mainz from 17 July 1935 until his death.

Stohr was born in Friedberg, Germany. He entered the seminary in Mainz in 1909 and was ordained as a priest on 19 October 1913 in Mainz Cathedral. After the death of Bishop Ludwig Maria Hugo, he was elected bishop by the cathedral chapter on 10 June 1935 and confirmed by Pope Pius XI on 17 July 1935. He was consecrated by Archbishop Conrad Gröber on 24 August 1935.

His time in office was dominated by World War II and the subsequent reconstruction efforts. He died in Seligenstadt.

Amid 1941 Catholic protests over Nazi euthanasia led by Bishop Clemens August Graf von Galen, Stohr sermonized against the taking of life.

References

External links
 

Bishops of Mainz (1802-present)
Roman Catholics in the German Resistance
20th-century German Roman Catholic bishops
1890 births
1961 deaths
Grand Crosses with Star and Sash of the Order of Merit of the Federal Republic of Germany
People from Friedberg, Hesse
20th-century German Roman Catholic priests